Statistics of the Ekstraklasa for the 1939 season. The championship was unfinished because of the Nazi German attack on Poland which triggered the Second World War.

League table

Results

References
Poland - List of final tables (RSSSF)

Ekstraklasa seasons
1
Pol
Pol